Office Office is an Indian Hindi-language television sitcom that premiered on SAB TV on 3 September 2001. The show was a satirical take on the prevalent corruption in India. The series starred Pankaj Kapur in the role of Mussadilal.

Cast
 Pankaj Kapur as Mussadi Lal
 Manoj Pahwa as Bhatia
 Deven Bhojani as Patel
 Asawari Joshi as Ushaji
 Sanjay Mishra as Shukla
 Hemant Pandey as Pandeyji
 Vrajesh Hirjee as Patel (Season 2)
 Eva Grover as Tina Sharma

Production
The filming took place at Gemini studios and Kamalistan studio in Mumbai.

Reception
This show received positive responses for its  storyline and won the 'Best Comedy' award at the 'RAPA Awards' in 2001 and 2002.

Sequels and film adaptation
A follow up series to Office Office, Naya Office Office was launched on Star One in 2007. A comic book series based on the show was also launched The books were published by Prakash Books.

A film based on series titled Chala Mussaddi... Office Office was released on 5 August 2011 and opened to mostly negative reviews from critics.

References

External links
 

Hindi comedy shows
Sony SAB original programming
Indian comedy television series
Indian television sitcoms
Workplace comedy television series
Television shows adapted into films
2001 Indian television series debuts
2000s satirical television series
Star One (Indian TV channel) original programming